The Pervenets-class ironclads were a group of three armored frigates built for the Imperial Russian Navy in the 1860s. The first ship was built in England because the Russian Empire lacked the ability to build its own ironclads, but the other two were built in Russia. All three ships differed from one another as the design evolved over time. None of the ships ever saw combat and only  had an eventful career, sinking a wooden frigate in an collision in 1869 and sinking herself in 1885. She was refloated and returned to service. They were assigned to the Baltic Fleet upon completion and never left Russian waters. They served with the Gunnery Training Detachment for the bulk of their careers before being reduced to reserve in 1904. Pervenets survived World War II and was scrapped in the early 1960s, Ne Tron Menia was sunk during the war and scrapped around 1950, while Kremls fate after her sale is unknown

Background
The ironclad was developed as a result of the vulnerability of wooden warships to explosive or incendiary shells as demonstrated by the Russian destruction of a Turkish squadron at the Battle of Sinope. The first ironclad battleship, was launched by the French Navy in November 1859. It was followed by the British . Russia was among the first countries to follow.

Design
The Naval Ministry initially ordered two ships. The first ship in the class,  (Firstborn), was built in England and the second identical ship,  (Don't touch me) in Saint Petersburg. A few months later the decision was made to build a third ship,  (Kremlin), at the Neva shipyards in Saint Petersburg.

The ships were smaller and slower than the contemporary British HMS Warrior and French La Gloire, and were in fact designated "Armored Battery", rather "Armored Frigate", such as the later . They had the same  armour as Warrior. Kreml had a few modifications such as a teak layer under the armor and design-planned later upgrade to the  guns.

Ships

Service history
All three ships served in the Baltic Fleet. They never saw any combat action, and gradually transferred from combat ships to training and coastal defence ships. The last ship in the class, Kreml suffered several serious accidents, accidentally scuttling the frigate Orel in 1869. Kreml itself sank due to a storm on 29 May 1885, although she was recovered five days later and returned to service. The last ship of the class, she was scrapped in October 1905.

See also
 List of ironclads of Russia

Notes

Footnotes

References

 
 

Naval ships of Russia
Ironclad warships of the Imperial Russian Navy